The Mulatos River is a river of Urabá Antioquia, Colombia. It drains into the Caribbean Sea.

See also
List of rivers of Colombia

References
Rand McNally, The New International Atlas, 1993.

Rivers of Colombia